Alexandra Day (born 1941) is an American children's book author. Alexandra Day is a pseudonym; her real name is Sandra Louise Woodward Darling. She is the author of Good Dog, Carl, which tells the story of a Rottweiler named Carl who looks after a baby named Madeleine. The book was first published in 1985 by Day's own publishing company, Green Tiger Press. Good Dog, Carl has been followed by a whole series of popular Carl books, published by Farrar, Straus and Giroux.

Early life
Day was born in 1941 in Cincinnati, Ohio to a large and close-knit family. Painting was a popular family recreation, and almost every family excursion included one or more easels and a variety of sketch pads, chalks, paints, and pencils. For four years, the family lived on a hundred-acre farm in Kentucky. Here young Sandra grew especially fond of riding and training horses, and became a dog owner for the first time. Living in the country also provided plenty of time for reading, a life-long passion.

Career
She and her husband, Harold Darling, founded a publishing company, Green Tiger Press, in 1970. Meanwhile, Day began a career in illustration, and illustrated her first book in 1983: The Teddy Bears' Picnic, based on a popular children's song by Jimmy Kennedy. In 1986 the Green Tiger was sold to Simon & Schuster and the Darlings started a book packaging company called Blue Lantern Publishing. In 1993, the Darlings moved to Seattle and founded a new publishing company, Laughing Elephant. Harold died in 2016 and Laughing Elephant is now run by Day and her children, Benjamin and Sacheverell.

Carl book series
According to Day, the inspiration for Good Dog, Carl came from a trip to Zurich, Switzerland in 1983. Day and her husband saw in a bookshop window there a was looking an antique German picture sheet by the great German illustrator and pop-up artist, Lothar Meggndorfer, of a poodle playing with a baby who was supposed to be taking a nap. This image proved the inspiration for Good Dog, Carl. Day's own dog, a Rottweiler named Toby, was the model for the book's main character, and since then five other family Rottweilers have been models for the books. All of the dogs have had their own names: Arambarri, Zabala, Zubiaga, Zulaica and Abelard. Day's granddaughter, Madeleine was the inspiration and model for the baby in the original Carl book.

Carl's Christmas was a New York Times bestseller.

Beside the "Carl" series, Day created the Frank and Ernest series of books featuring a bear and an elephant who engage in the colorful language of diners, CBers and baseball.

Bibliography

The Carl series
 Good Dog, Carl, Green Tiger Press, 1985
 Carl Goes Shopping, Farrar, Straus & Giroux, 1989
 Carl's Christmas, Farrar, Straus & Giroux, 1990
 Carl's Afternoon in the Park, Farrar, Straus & Giroux, 1991
 Carl's Masquerade, Farrar, Straus & Giroux, 1992
 Carl Goes to Daycare, Farrar, Straus & Giroux, 1993
 Carl Pops Up, Simon & Schuster, 1994
 Carl Makes a Scrapbook, Farrar, Straus & Giroux, 1994
 My Puppy's Record Book, Farrar, Straus & Giroux, 1994; Laughing Elephant, 2005
 Carl's Birthday, Farrar, Straus & Giroux, 1995
 Carl's Baby Journal''', Farrar, Straus & Giroux, 1996
 Follow Carl!, Farrar, Straus & Giroux, 1998
 Carl's Sleepy Afternoon, Farrar, Straus & Giroux, 2005
 You're a Good Dog, Carl!, Farrar, Straus & Giroux, 2007
 Carl's Summer Vacation, Farrar, Straus & Giroux, 2008
 Carl's Snowy Afternoon, Farrar, Straus & Giroux, 2009
 Carl and the Puppies, Square Fish, 2011
 Carl and the Baby Duck, Square Fish, 2011
 Carl and the Kitten, Square Fish, 2011
 Carl and the Sick Puppy, Square Fish, 2012
 Carl at the Dog Show, Farrar, Straus & Giroux, 2012
 Carl's Halloween, Farrar, Straus & Giroux, 2015Carl and the Baby Elephant, Laughing Elephant, 2016Goodnight, Good Dog Carl, Laughing Elephant, 2019Good Dog Carl's Valentine, Laughing Elephant, 2021

Other books
 The Teddy Bears’ Picnic, Green Tiger Press, 1983 (by Jimmy Kennedy)
 The Blue Faience Hippopotamus, Green Tiger Press, 1984 (by Joan Grant)
 When You Wish upon a Star, Green Tiger Press, 1994
 Frank and Ernest, Scholastic Corporation, 1988
 Paddy's Payday, Puffin Books, 1989
 Frank and Ernest Play Ball, Scholastic, 1990
 River Parade, Puffin, 1990
 Frank and Ernest on the Road, Scholastic, 1994
 A Bouquet, Laughing Elephant, 1996
 The Christmas We Moved to the Barn, HarperCollins, 1997 (by Cooper Edens)
 Mirror, Farrar, Straus & Giroux, 1997 (by Christina Darling)
 Boswell Wide Awake, Farrar, Straus & Giroux, 1999
 Darby, The Special Order Pup, Dial, 2000 (with Cooper Edens)
 Special Deliveries, HarperCollins, 2001 (by Cooper Edens)
 Puppy Trouble, Farrar, Straus & Giroux, 2002
 The Flight of a Dove, Farrar, Straus & Giroux, 2004
 Not Forgotten, Laughing Elephant, 2004
 Hooray for Dogs, Laughing Elephant, 2008
 The Fairy Dogfather'', Laughing Elephant, 2012

References

External links

 Publisher's Author Page

1941 births
Living people
People from Cincinnati
American women children's writers
American children's writers
21st-century American women
21st-century pseudonymous writers
Pseudonymous women writers